Kayıkçı may refer to:
 Kayıkçı, Susurluk, village in the Susurluk district of Balıkesir province in Turkey

People with the surname
 Burcu Kayıkcı (born 1980), Turkish politician
 Fatma Kayıkçı, Turkish murder victim
 Hasret Kayikçi (born 1991), German footballer

See also 
 Kayıkçılar